Thirupampuram is a village in the Kudavasal taluk of Tiruvarur district, Tamil Nadu, India. The famous Ragu, Kethu temple is located in Tirupampuram. The Ragu, Kethutemple is a part Pamburanathar Siva Temple.

Demographics 
As per the 2001 census, Thirupampuram  had a total population of 1,239 with 597 males and 642 females. The sex ratio was 1,075. The literacy rate was 66.52.

References

External link 

Villages in Tiruvarur district